Simurq PIK was an Azerbaijani football club based in Zaqatala, that competed in the Azerbaijan Premier League.

History

Early years (2005–2009)
The club was founded in 2005 and participated in the Azerbaijan First Division. The club's first season was very successful, and in the 2006–07 season, the club was participating in the Azerbaijan Premier League. After its debuting season in the Premier League of Azerbaijan, Simurq finished 9th out of 14 clubs.

The Azerbaijani magazine Football+ recognized Simurq as the "Surprise of the Year" of the 2006–07 season based on polling results. In 2007–08 season club has made another step forward, and finished the season at 7th place. The club gained third place in Azerbaijan Premier League 2008-09, by making the best indicator of the team in its history.

Recent years (2009–2015)
In 2009, club's debut in European competitions was not very successful as they were eliminated in the 1st qualifying round of UEFA Europa League by Bnei Yehuda. The 2009–10 season for club was not successful, even though the team had good start before the winter break. After the winter, club began to fall in the standings and won only 8th place, while coach Roman Pokora dismissed after a string of poor results.

In June 2010, the club's executive director, former Azerbaijan national football team manager Gjoko Hadžievski became the club's new coach. However, due to financial problems Simurq could not sign big local and foreign players and coach staff was forced to take less experienced players and use from youth system. The 2010–11 season became the worst in club history as Simurq was relegated to the Azerbaijan First Division after finishing 11th place. However club is allowed participate in the next season to replace Mughan who had sponsorship problems.

On 18 July 2011, the club signed a contract with Sergey Yuran, former Ukrainian football player and association football coach. On 5 March 2012, after Sergey Yuran's resignation, Igor Getman became the first Azerbaijani manager to lead Simurq as caretaker until the end of the season. But after six days, the club announced Giorgi Chikhradze as their new coach. Simurq started 2012–13 season strongly, but after the start of the new year, team's form stumbled, hampering their European cup objective.

During the summer of 2015 the club folded due financial problems.

Domestic
As of 29 May 2015:

European

Stadium

Zaqatala City Stadium is a football stadium in Zagatala, Azerbaijan.  It is currently used as club's home stadium and holds 3,500 people.

Crest and colours
Since the club's foundation, Simurq have had only one crest. It was officially adopted for the start of the 2006–07 season and based on a mythical sacred Phoenix firebird with castle background. It stems from the club's name Simurq, which means Phoenix in Azerbaijani language. The new home and away kits were unveiled in June 2013 for the 2013–2014 season. The home kit is black and yellow stripes and the away kit is white, with Joma being the kit manufacturer.

In 2013, the club unveiled an official crest, designed by Azerbaijani graphic designer Elnur Sharifli from Poland.

Supporters
Simurq has a large fanbase in relation to its comparative lack of success on the pitch. Simurq supporters have played a vital role in the club's long term stay at Zaqatala.

Managers

References

External links
 Official Website

 
Simurq Zaqatala
Association football clubs established in 2005
2005 establishments in Azerbaijan
Association football clubs disestablished in 2015
2015 disestablishments in Azerbaijan